Piscinola-Scampia (formerly Piscinola) is a station on Line 1 of the Naples Metro and together with Garibaldi is one of the two termini.

The station, inaugurated on 19 July 1995 together with the extension from the Colli Aminei station, consists of two levels: in the upper one stands the terminal station of line 1, while in the lower one is the terminal station of the Linea Arcobaleno (Piscinola Scampia station of the Naples-Aversa line) which between 2005 and 2009 partially restored the lower Alifana closed in 1976.

It has been decided that this station will not be a fixed terminus, as the line will continue towards the Capodichino airport, the business center until reaching Piazza Garibaldi. The station will therefore be located between the Miano and Chiaiano stops.

Since 2013 the station has hosted some works by the Neapolitan artist Felice Pignataro, following a petition signed by the citizens.

Since 2017 the full name of the station has been changed to "Piscinola-Scampia", replacing the original name of "Piscinola-Secondigliano".

Services 
The station has:

  Ticket office at the counter
  Toilets

Exchanges 

  Bus stop
  Naples-Giugliano-Aversa line (Linea Arcobaleno)

References 

Naples Metro stations
Railway stations opened in 1995
1995 establishments in Italy
Railway stations in Italy opened in the 20th century
Railway stations in Italy opened in the 21st century